East Side of Manhattan refers to the side of Manhattan which abuts the East River and faces Brooklyn and Queens. Fifth Avenue, Central Park from 59th to 110th Streets, and Broadway below 8th Street separate it from the West Side.

The major neighborhoods on the East Side include (from north to south) East Harlem, Yorkville, the Upper East Side, Turtle Bay, Murray Hill, Kips Bay, Gramercy, East Village, and the Lower East Side.  The main north–south expressways servicing the East Side are the Franklin D. Roosevelt East River Drive and Harlem River Drive, which for the majority of their length are separated from the east shore of the island by the Manhattan Waterfront Greenway. The East Side is served by the IRT East Side Line subway and by many bus lines.

See also 

 West Side (Manhattan)
 East Side Kids

Neighborhoods in Manhattan